The following lists events that happened during 2007 in Sudan.

Incumbents
President: Omar al-Bashir
Vice President: 
 Salva Kiir Mayardit (First)
 Ali Osman Taha (Second)

Events

January
 January 24 -  A Sudanese airliner, Air West Flight 612, carrying 103 people, is hijacked by a lone gunman and diverted to N'Djamena, Chad. The Air West flight lands at the airport in N'Djamena and the hijacker is arrested.

May
 May 2 - The International Criminal Court issues arrest warrants for Sudanese humanitarian affairs minister Ahmed Haroun and Janjaweed leader Ali Kushayb on charges of war crimes committed during the Darfur conflict.

June
 June 15 - Sudan and a breakaway faction of the Justice and Equality Movement of Darfur sign a peace treaty.

August
 August 1 - Sudan pledges support for UNAMID, a joint United Nations and African Union peacekeeping force in Darfur.
 August 3 - Rebel groups in Darfur hold meetings in Tanzania jointly mediated by the United Nations and the African Union to resolve disputes.
 August 28 - The Sudanese government and the United Nations launch a flood appeal to help victims of recent flooding which has killed 89 people and destroyed 73,000 homes.
 August 29 - John Holmes, the United Nations' emergency relief coordinator, warns that refugees of the Darfur conflict are arming themselves and may soon be able to defend themselves if the Sudanese government renews its attacks.

September
 September 2 - Sudan postpones a census that is a crucial for the success of two national elections.
 September 3 - The Secretary-General of the United Nations Ban Ki-Moon arrives in Sudan to press for an end to violence in Darfur.

References

 
2000s in Sudan
Years of the 21st century in Sudan
Sudan
Sudan